Lars Pettersson (born 29 March 1953) is a retired Swedish footballer (goalkeeper). Pettersson made 21 Allsvenskan appearances for Djurgården in 1978 and 1979.

References

Swedish footballers
Allsvenskan players
Djurgårdens IF Fotboll players
Association football goalkeepers
1953 births
Living people